Allosyncarpia ternata, commonly known as an-binik, is a species of rainforest trees constituting part of the botanical family Myrtaceae and included in the eucalypts group. The only species in its genus, it was described in 1981 by Stanley Blake of the Queensland Herbarium. They grow naturally into large, spreading, shady trees, and are endemic to the Northern Territory of Australia. They grow in sandstone gorges along creeks emerging from the Arnhem Land plateau.

The common name anbinik comes from the Kundedjnjenghmi and Kundjeyhmi dialects of Bininj Kunwok, spoken in West Arnhem Land. In other dialects, such as the Kunwinjku spoken in Gunbalanya, the tree is known as manbinik.

Distribution and habitat
The tree dominates the closed monsoon rainforest communities along the sandstone escarpment of the western Arnhem Land Plateau.  The distribution of the species appears to be limited to areas not subject to wildfire.

Ecology
Allosyncarpia dominated rainforest is an important vegetation community along the floristic boundary between the patches of monsoon forest that are sheltered from wildfire, and the fire-tolerant, eucalypt dominated, tropical savannas. 
A species of sandstone favouring monitor, the long-tailed Varanus glebopalma, is closely associated with Allosyncarpia woodland in some parts of its range.

References

Notes

Sources
 
 

Flora of the Northern Territory
Arnhem Land
Monotypic Myrtaceae genera
Myrtaceae